Khindsi Lake is a lake near the city of Ramtek in the Nagpur district of India.
Boating, watersports, restaurant and resort is operated by Rajkamal Tourism  and Olive Resorts at Khindsi lake.
It is Central India's largest boating center and amusement park with many tourists visiting every year.

References

Lakes of Maharashtra
Tourist attractions in Nagpur district